Stowe, Northamptonshire could refer to the following places in England:
Stowe Nine Churches, a civil parish containing:
Church Stowe, a settlement in that parish,
Upper Stowe, a settlement in that parish